Dortmund-Wickede is a railway station in the Dortmund district of Wickede in the German state of North Rhine-Westphalia. It is classified by Deutsche Bahn as a category 6 station. It was opened on 26 May 1963 on the Welver–Sterkrade railway completed between Welver and the old Dortmund Süd (south) station by the Royal Westphalian Railway Company on 15 May 1876 and electrified on 25 May 1984.

It is served by Rhine-Ruhr S-Bahn line S 4 at 20-minute intervals. It is also served by Dortmund Stadtbahn line U 43 at 20-minute intervals.

The station is also served by bus route R51 (Massen - Unna + Holzwickede - Opherdicke) of Verkehrsgesellschaft Kreis Unna at 60-minute intervals.

References 

Railway stations in Dortmund
S4 (Rhine-Ruhr S-Bahn)
Rhine-Ruhr S-Bahn stations
Dortmund VRR stations
Railway stations in Germany opened in 1963
1963 establishments in West Germany